The Bryn Mawr Apartment Hotel is a 12-story building in the Bryn Mawr Historic District in far-north neighborhood community of Edgewater in Chicago, Illinois. Located on North Kenmore Avenue, it is across the road from the Belle Shore Apartment Hotel. It was designated a historic Chicago Landmark by the Chicago City Council on November 6, 2002.

References

External links
Chicago Landmarks
Historic Images of Hotel

Residential buildings completed in 1928
Apartment buildings in Chicago
Residential skyscrapers in Chicago
1928 establishments in Illinois